Panachaiki F.C. (Greek: Παναχαϊκή ΓΕ ΠΑΕ ) is a Greek professional football club based in Patras, Greece and they play in Super League Greece 2, the second tier of greek football. Founded in 1891, they have reached the Greek Cup semi-finals twice (1979, 1997), as well as the quarter-finals on ten occasions. Moreover, they were the first Greek club outside Athens (including Piraeus) and Thessaloniki to represent Greece in a European competition, the 1973–74 UEFA Cup.

Panachaiki FC is the football department of Panachaiki Gymnastiki Enosi (P.G.E.), a multi-sport club. In 1979, the department became professional and independent. They have played their home games in various grounds since their first official game in 1899, mainly the Kostas Davourlis Stadium, their traditional home ground, and the Pampeloponnisiako Stadium.

History

Establishment 
The history of Panachaiki began in 1891, when Panachaikos Gymnastikos Syllogos (Pan-Achaean Gymnastic Club) was founded. In 1894, a rival sports club, Gymnastiki Eteria Patron (Gymnastic Company of Patras), was founded in Patras by former Panachaikos' members.

The football department was founded in 1899 by a Brit, Arthur Morphy, and played its first friendly game against a team of British sailors the same year, winning 4–2. Since 1902, he created a football team and the Gymnastics Company, playing many friendly games with each other and the other clubs of Patras that were created.

First years

1923–1940 
The first divisions of Panachaiki were founded in 1923. The players on the football team were athletes from the Club's other departments, Italian immigrants and members of the British community of Patras, such as Poulos Ant., Antonopoulos Themist., Martijian Mardik, Liakopoulos A., Goliidis A., Konstantinos K., Kostopoulos Eleftherias, Katsanos G., Dilon Edouardos, McLin, Ochan Ochanian, Evangelion Stavros, Belegris Chr., Moulas A., Kekkos P., Kostopoulos P., Maniatopoulos Andreas, Argyropoulos Andreas, Schinas K., Kostopoulos Al., Moushochoritis Andr., Sukovetis G., and others. Due to the lack of rivals, the first games were played against the crews of foreign warships arriving in Patras.

In 1924, Panachaiki had two equivalent soccer teams, A and B, since both the Panachaikos and the Gymnastics Company had football sections. As a result, some players left Panachaiki and created other clubs in the following years. At the same time, in 1922, with the Asia Minor Catastrophe, thousands of refugees arrived in Patras, bringing with them their love of football, also establishing several new football clubs. This situation led to the secession of the associations from SEGAS and the establishment of the Hellenic Football Federation of Patras in 1927. In 1927, the new association founded a championship, in which Panachaiki was a leading contender, prevailing many times until 1959, when the National Football Federation (National Football Association). Before the FCA Patras the championship was organized by Panachaiki, from 1923–24 to 1925–26. At that time, the Greek championship was a tournament of the Athens, Piraeus and Thessaloniki champions, with the Hellenic Football Federation for many years having excluded provincial groups. Patras, due to disagreements of the clubs and disobedience to the Epirus Achaia, failed to organize a regular championship and this resulted in its exclusion from the Greek championship.

Regardless of this, the Athenian clubs held friendly games in the city, culminating on 11 August 1945, when Panachaiki confronted Greece on its field and was defeated by 7–1. In 1928, Panachaiki faced Panathinaikos, who won 4–3. In 1929, AEK losing 0–1, 0–2 and 0–6, while against Olympiacos he was defeated the same year 2–5, in 1930 1–7 and in 1934 0–7. The significant difference in capacity was due, among other things, to the fact that the Athens and Piraeus teams had already a 25-year football tournament with tournament events. Other Athens-friendly teams: 27/3/1927 Panachaiki 2–3 Peloponnese Athens - 27/11/1927 Panachaiki 3–1 AT Group Atromitos - 18/4/1928 Panachaiki 2–3 Greek-Russian - 25/4/1928 Panachaiki 5–2 Piraeus Group of Fans - 2/7/1928 Panachaiki 5–3 Bank of America Group - 25/12/1928 Atromitos Athens 5–1 Panachaiki - 14/1/1929 National 0–0 Panachaiki - 29/6/1929 Palaio Faliro 2–3 Panachaiki - 2/12/1929 Panathinaikos 3–0 Panachaiki - 3/1/1930 Piraeus Defense 1–0 Panachaiki.

1940–1953 
In 1940, Greece enters World War II and stops every sporting activity. Some friendly games are played during the occupation, while in 1943 a cup of Patras is organized. Upon the end of the war, the local championship is restarted. During the Greek-Italian war the following athletes of Panachaiki fell: Kapatos Fotis, Niaros Dimitris, Polymeris Nikos, Tsiros Philipas, Mavromatis. During this period Panakaiiki participates in the Patras Championship by giving some chronic qualifying matches to the Pan-Hellenic Championship, without success. The team during the war coached the well-known duo Raptis-Skondras, Reveliotis-Zoumpos.

1954–1961: National championships 
In 1954, Panachaiki participates for the first time in the Pan-Hellenic Championship and occupies the 6th and last place. In 1955, Panetolikos was eliminated in the qualifiers of the Southern Greece Championship. In 1956, it took third place in the South Championship behind Olympic and National Piraeus with 13 points, while in 1957, it was again third in the South Championship. In 1958, it was second in the South Championship, in 1959, it was excluded in the qualifiers from Panegialios in the South Championship, as in 1960. In order to compete a team in qualifying for the league of southern Greece had to conquer the local first, as Panahaiki did all of them the years. After the South or Northern Greece Championship, the final phase of the Greek Championship was followed. The case of Panegialios and Panetolikos, belonging to the same association, was due to the fact that the EPPS of Patras organized two championships, one for the teams of Patras and one for the groups of the Region (i.e. Aitoloakarnania, Zakynthos, Kefallinia, Ilia, Rest of Achaia). Thus, the association each year had two different champions.

1961–1975 
In 1961, Panachaiki won the South League and participated for the first time in the history in the Football League. From then until 2007, Panachaiki will not again compete in a lower league. Panachaiki immediately starred in the Football League, targeting on the rise every year, which it secured in 1969. But Panachaiki's virgin presence in the big category is downgraded as she is accused of attempting to bribe with Aris. Consequently, it is zero in 13 races. The following year, however, Panachaiki starred in the Football League and returned.

In 1972, Panachaiki returns to Super League and starts the course of the golden team of Davourlis, Rigas, Stravopodis, Michalopoulos and others towards the successes, culminating in the UEFA cup. That same year ended 6th with 11 wins, 14 draws, 9 defeats, and a total of 40–35 goals. A typical feature of the team was the average of 8,773 tickets, the second highest among the provincial teams (Larissa's first champion in 1988).

In 1973, Panachaiki took the 4th position in the league with 16 wins, 12 draws, 6 defeats, 42–27 goals, and wins the exit to UEFA Cup. Panachaiki was the first provincial team to succeed, defeating the championship from PAOK, who won in the Toumba Stadium with 5–3 in the last game, when PAOK would be a champion.

Panachaiki lived its greatest football glory in the early and mid 1970s, when a team led by Kostas Davourlis impressed Greece and took part in the 1973–74 UEFA Cup, eliminating Austrian Grazer AK before losing to Dutch Twente. Former Manchester United manager Wilf McGuinness took over as head coach for the 1974–75 season, before he returned to England eighteen months later.

In 1974, Panachaiki finished 6th with 13 wins, 12 draws and 9 defeats, goals 42–37. Kostas Davourlis' transcription instead of a record 10 million drachmas in Olympiacos is a powerful blow to the dreams of red-black fans for a championship. In 1975, Panachaiki took 7th place with 11 wins, 11 draws and 12 defeats, goals 41–39.

1976–2004 
In 1976, Panachaiki finishes 10th and begins its downward course as its big stars begin and leave, while the years weigh their legs. Thus, every year the team finishes in the last positions of the scoreboard until 1980–81, when Panachaiki relegated to the Football League. Since then, Panachaiki has been struggling between the Super League and the Football League, largely lacking in significant discrimination.

In 1988, Panachaiki plays in the league but is zero in the match against Panserraikos and is relegated. At the same time, Panachaiki's fans are demonstrating on the main streets of the city, setting up barricades and colliding with the police, causing episodes that have a bad account of 15 injured. In the summer of 1996, Panachaiki participated in the Intertoto Cup, taking part for the second time in its history in a European event and results: 1–1 with Stabaek home, 1–2 with Dinamo Moscow away, 4–2 with Torshavn in and 2–4 from Genk away. In 2003, with the intervention of the then Venizelos Minister, Panachaiki is punished for debts and is eliminated from the Football League in the 9th game.

2004–2015 
In 2004, Panachaiki had to fight under the law in D Ethniki. Last minute, however, it is decided and absorbed by Patraikos F.C., also a Football League's team without any debts. This creates the "Panahaiki GI 2005" which is regularly taking part in the Football League in 2005. Nevertheless, the team is relegated and since 2006 is in the Gamma Ethniki.

Although, it managed to rise to the Football League in 2011, it ended up being the first in its club, the Football League's and Football League's 2 Primary Disciplinary Committee decided to relegate the squad and a fine of EUR 300,000 for a case bribe in a fight with the Olympiakos Chersonissos. At the same time, for the same case, a fine was imposed and a five-year blockade on the chairman Alexis Kougias. However, the EPAA Appeals Committee decided to leave the team in the second category and replace the penalty by subtracting 5 points from the new championship and acquitted its chairman A. Kougias.

In 2015, then Panachaiki's chairman of the group leaves and in his post leaves the general manager until that time. The team is relegated the same year in Gamma Ethniki counting only 13 players in the roster.

Modern years 

In 2016, Panachaiki, due to its demise in Gamma Ethniki Category, goes to the hands of the amateur Panachaikis. Fifteen city entrepreneurs create the "Panachaean Alliance" in order to take over the reins of the group and start efforts to clear their debts from previous team administrations. In the post of technical director, the veteran international footballer and sometimes the player of the team Kostas Katsouranis, who takes over the organization of the football section, is hired by the "alliance". The team crowned champion the same year and returned to the Football League and the professional categories of the country.

On 21 June 2017, the Deputy Minister of Sports tabled an amendment to Hellenic Parliament concerning article 10 of the new Sport Law, which states inter alia that from the 2016–17 season onwards, any A.A.E. it is demoted in amateur category and put into liquidation if new A.A.E. is set up for the same sport by the same founding sports club, any liability goes to the natural persons who are responsible. The amendment is voted by a majority in the Parliament a few days later, paving the way for a new Football Club under the name "PAE Panachaiki 1891" and the creation of the group's current signal.

From January 2019, in PAE Panachaiki 1891 has put in place a new administrative model. Messrs. Bakalaros, Polydropopoulos, Chrysanthopoulos, Kefalas, Kolokythas, Lampropoulos, Michalakos and Vasilopoulos are now compiling the new shareholders' scheme that "run" the developments. Dimitris Drosos, who has taken responsibility for decisions concerning the football section, is also actively involved in this effort. The goal of all, inside and out of administration, fans, veterans and the whole of Patras, of which it is a symbol, is soon to be found in the position it deserves in Greek football.

During the 2018–19 season, Panachaiki was the sole team which managed to beat (2–1 in Patras) during the season, for a Greek cup match, PAOK, the club which gained in the same season undefeated the Greek championship.

Stadiums

The team's privately owned arena is the Kostas Davourlis Stadium, holding a capacity of 11,321 spectators. Panachaiki has also been using the municipality-operated Pampeloponnisiako Stadium, which has a capacity of 23,588.

Honours

Domestic

Leagues 
Football League
 Winners (6) (record): 1964, 1969, 1971, 1982, 1984, 1987
Gamma Ethniki 
 Winners (3): 2011, 2017, 2022

Cups 
Greek Cup
 Semi-finals (2): 1979, 1997

European matches

Season to season 

* Finished 2nd in the South Group and 6th in the promotion playoffs

Participation history
First Division (26): 1969–1970, 1971–1981, 1982–1983, 1984–1986, 1987–1988, 1990–1994, 1995–1998, 1999–2003
Second Division (30): 1960–1969, 1970–1971, 1981–1982, 1983–1984, 1986–1987, 1988–1990, 1994–1995, 1998–1999, 2003–2006, 2011–2016, 2017–2021, 2022–present
Third Division (7): 2006–2011, 2016–2017, 2021–2022

Players

Current squad

Notable players 

Greece
 Kostas Andriopoulos
 Christos Apostolidis
 Kostas Davourlis
 Christos Eleftheriadis
 Paris Georgakopoulos
 Grigoris Georgatos
 Takis Ikonomopoulos
 Kostas Katsouranis
 Petros Leventakos
 Andreas Michalopoulos
 Manolis Pappas
 Themis Rigas
 Dimitris Spentzopoulos
 Vassilis Stravopodis

South America
 Fabián Caballero
  Luciano de Souza

Africa
 Nicolas Dikoume
 Joël Epalle
 Raymond Kalla
 Olivier Makor
 Amaechi Ottiji

Europe
 Demetris Kizas
 Walter Wagner
 Nenad Vukčević
 Krzysztof Nowak
 Mihail Majearu
 Boško Mihajlović
 Björn Enqvist

Personnel

Ownership and current board

|}

Technical staff

|}

Sponsorships 
Great Shirt Sponsor: Zagori Mineral Water
Official Sport Clothing Manufacturer: PlaySports

See also 
 Panachaiki G.E.

Notes

References 
 Papageorgiou, V.G., Patraikon Imerologion, 1906 
 
 Ιkonomopoulos, V., Patras Sports Panorama, 1994
 
 Kokkovikas, K., The sports past of Achaia, 2004
 Patras Municipality, 100 years of football in Patras, 2006

External links

Official websites
Official website 
News sites
Panachaiki on sportfmpatras.gr 
Media
Official Facebook page
Official YouTube channel

 
Association football clubs established in 1891
Football clubs in Western Greece
Achaea
Sport in Patras
1891 establishments in Greece
Gamma Ethniki clubs